Great Council can refer to:
Cantonal Council of Zürich, until 1869 the Grosser Rat ('Great Council')
Conseil du Roi (France)
Great Council of Mechelen
Great Council of Venice
Magnum Concilium (England)
Great Council of Genoa